Bowdoin may refer to:
 Bowdoin, Maine, a town
 Bowdoin College, a college in Brunswick, Maine
 Bowdoin Street, a street in Boston, Massachusetts
 Bowdoin (MBTA station)
 Bowdoin National Wildlife Refuge, a wildlife refuge in Montana
 Bowdoin (Arctic schooner)
 Bowdoin prize
 Bowdoin Fjord, Greenland
 Bowdoin Glacier, Greenland

People with the name
 James Bowdoin (1726–1790), American political and intellectual leader
 James Bowdoin III (1752–1811), American philanthropist and statesman
 Jim Bowdoin (1904–1969), American football player
 Temple Bowdoin (1863–1914), American businessman
 Bowdoin B. Crowninshield (1867–1948), American naval architect